The Guyandotte River is a tributary of the Ohio River, approximately 166 mi (267 km) long, in southwestern West Virginia in the United States.  It was named after the French term for the Wendat Native Americans. It drains an area of the unglaciated Allegheny Plateau south of the Ohio between the watersheds of the Kanawha River to the northeast and Twelvepole Creek and the Big Sandy River to the southwest.  Via the Ohio River, it is part of the Mississippi River watershed.

Course

The Guyandotte River is formed in southwestern Raleigh County by the confluence of three streams, Winding Gulf, Stonecoal Creek, and the Devils Fork. The Guyandotte flows initially west-northwestwardly into Wyoming and Mingo counties.  It turns briefly northward in Mingo County and enters Logan County, where it turns north-northwestwardly for the remainder of its highly meandering course through Logan, Lincoln and Cabell counties. It enters the Ohio River from the south at Huntington, about 5 mi (8 km) east of the city's  downtown.

Dams
A U.S. Army Corps of Engineers dam in Mingo County causes the river to widen as R. D. Bailey Lake in Mingo and western Wyoming counties.

Tributaries
The Mud River joins the Guyandotte at Barboursville in Cabell County.  The Slab Fork joins the Guyandotte in downtown Mullens in Wyoming County. Big Ugly Creek joins the Guyandotte in Lincoln County.

Upper Guyandotte Watershed Association
In Mullens, an active watershed organization is working to reduce pollution in the headwaters of the Guyandotte River.  The Upper Guyandotte Watershed Association (UGWA) is a grassroots, community-based organization working to reduce sources of pollution in order to clean up streams and make the watershed a better place to live.  UGWA has garnered much public support and produced results in partnering with numerous local, state, and federal agencies.

Cities and towns along the Guyandotte River

 Barboursville
 Branchland, West Virginia
 Chapmanville
 Gilbert
 Harts
 Huntington
 Logan
 Man
 Corinne
 Mullens
 Pineville
 West Hamlin
 West Logan

Variant names
According to the Geographic Names Information System (GNIS), the Guyandotte River has also been known as:

 Arbuckles River
 Big Laurel Fork
 Guiandotte River
 Guyan Dot River
 Guyan Dott River
 Guyan River
 Guyandates Creek
 Guyandot Creek
 Guyandot River
 Guyandott River
 La-ke-we-ke-ton
 Little Guiandot
 Se-co-ne
 Se-co-nee
 Secone
 Seconec

See also

 List of West Virginia rivers

References

External links

 R.D. Bailey Lake website, US Army Corps of Engineers
 "Guyandotte" City of Huntington website
 Upper Guyandotte Watershed Association
 Rural Appalachian Improvement League
 Don Mills, "Guyandotte Disaster", Feb 2005, based on "Guyandotte Disaster", January 1, 1913", Cabell Record Archives, reprinted in Chesapeake & Ohio Historical Society Magazine, May 1994, Sections 3 and 4 have contemporary photos from Cabell Record

 
 
Rivers of West Virginia
Tributaries of the Ohio River
Allegheny Plateau
Rivers of Cabell County, West Virginia
Rivers of Lincoln County, West Virginia
Rivers of Logan County, West Virginia
Rivers of Mingo County, West Virginia
Rivers of Raleigh County, West Virginia
Rivers of Wyoming County, West Virginia
Huntington, West Virginia